The Sikorsky S-1 was the first fixed-wing aircraft design by Igor Sikorsky. In February 1910 work began on the pusher configured biplane powered by a  Anzani three-cylinder, air-cooled engine. The machine was completed  in April and Sikorsky began his first attempts at flight. In early May during a take-off attempt on a windy day the machine briefly became airborne due mostly to a favorable headwind. Further attempts were less successful, and Sikorsky disassembled it, saving the main wing section to construct the S-2.

Specifications

See also

References

S-036
Biplanes
Single-engined pusher aircraft
Russian civil aircraft
Aircraft first flown in 1910